Lahti is a Finnish surname meaning "bay" or "gulf".

Geographical distribution
As of 2014, 65.6% of all known bearers of the surname Lahti were residents of Finland (frequency 1:737), 22.0% of the United States (1:144,270), 7.6% of Sweden (1:11,357) and 2.4% of Canada (1:133,326).

In Finland, the frequency of the surname was higher than national average (1:737) in the following regions:
 1. South Ostrobothnia (1:295)
 2. Central Ostrobothnia (1:318)
 3. Pirkanmaa (1:437)
 4. Central Finland (1:488)
 5. Tavastia Proper (1:517)
 6. Satakunta (1:532)
 7. Southwest Finland (1:582)
 8. Kymenlaakso (1:721)

People
 Aimo Lahti (1896–1970), Finnish weapon designer
 Aki Lahti (1931–1998), Finnish chess master
 Arto Lahti (born 1949), Finnish professor and politician
 Christine Lahti (born 1950), American actress
 Jeff Lahti (born 1956), American baseball player
 Timi Lahti (born 1990), Finnish footballer

References

Finnish-language surnames
Surnames of Finnish origin